Sandersville may refer to:
 Sandersville, Georgia
 Sandersville, Mississippi
 Inglefield, Indiana, also known as Sandersville